Morton Aaron Brody (June 12, 1933 – March 25, 2000) was a United States district judge of the United States District Court for the District of Maine from 1991 to 2000.

Education and career

Brody was born in Lewiston, Maine.  He graduated from Bates College with a Bachelor of Arts degree in 1955 and University of Chicago Law School with a Juris Doctor in 1958. Brody was engaged in private practice in Washington, D.C. from 1958 to 1961 and in Waterville, Maine from 1961 to 1980. Brody was then appointed as a justice of the Superior Court of Maine, serving from 1980 to 1985. Brody served as chief justice of the Superior Court from 1985 to 1990, and as an associate justice of the Supreme Judicial Court of Maine from 1990 to 1991.

Federal judicial service

Brody was nominated by George H. W. Bush on June 14, 1991, to a new seat on the United States District Court for the District of Maine created by 104 Stat. 5089. He was confirmed by the United States Senate on July 18, 1991, and received his commission on July 25, 1991. Brody's service terminated on March 25, 2000, due to death in Boston, Massachusetts. Colby College in Maine awards the Morton A. Brody Distinguished Judicial Service Award biennially.

See also
 List of Bates College people

References

External links
 
 Morton Brody Award

Bates College alumni
University of Chicago Law School alumni
1933 births
2000 deaths
Judges of the United States District Court for the District of Maine
United States district court judges appointed by George H. W. Bush
20th-century American judges
Maine state court judges
Justices of the Maine Supreme Judicial Court
People from Lewiston, Maine